The 1950 Calgary Stampeders finished in 4th place in the W.I.F.U. with a 4–10 record and failed to qualify for the playoffs.

Regular season

Season standings

Season schedule

References

Calgary Stampeders seasons
1950 Canadian football season by team